Bartlett is an unincorporated community and census-designated place in Fremont County, Iowa, United States. As of the 2010 census, it had a population of 50.

History
Bartlett was named after Annie Bartlett Phelps, wife of a railroad engineer. Bartlett was founded as a railroad town; rail service was established between Bartlett and Council Bluffs in January 1867.

Geography

Demographics

As of the census of 2010, there were 50 people, 23 households, and 15 families residing in the town. The racial makeup of the town was 92.0% White, 2.0% African American, 4.0% Native American, and 2.0% from two or more races.

There were 23 households, out of which 13.0% had children under the age of 18 living with them, 47.8% were married couples living together, 8.7% had a female householder with no husband present, 8.7% had a male householder with no wife present, and 34.8% were non-families. 21.7% of all households were made up of individuals. The average household size was 2.17 and the average family size was 2.53.

In the city the population was spread out, with 16% under the age of 18, 14% from 18 to 24, 16% from 25 to 44, 32% from 45 to 64, and 22% who were 65 years of age or older. The median age was 49 years. The gender makeup of the city was 58.0% male and 42.0% female.

References

Census-designated places in Fremont County, Iowa
Census-designated places in Iowa